Sam Phillips (born 31 May 1984) is an English actor and writer.

Phillips is the son of television director Nic Phillips and graduate of the Guildhall School of Music and Drama. Phillips is perhaps best known for his roles in children's comedy Hotel Trubble as Jamie and as Spencer Cavendish in the third series of Kay Mellor's The Syndicate starring alongside Anthony Andrews, Alice Krige, Lenny Henry, and Richard Rankin.

Phillips has also had roles in Far From The Madding Crowd, In The Flesh, Pete versus Life, Micro Men, My Family, EastEnders: E20, and The Crown.

His theatre work includes the National Theatre production of The History Boys as Lockwood, Much Ado About Nothing at Shakespeare's Globe as Claudio and Bertram Cates in the acclaimed production of Inherit The Wind at the Old Vic where he starred alongside Kevin Spacey under the direction of Trevor Nunn.

References

External links

Alumni of the Guildhall School of Music and Drama
British male film actors
Living people
1984 births
English male film actors
English male stage actors
Place of birth missing (living people)
21st-century English male actors